1278 and 1530 AM West Yorkshire was a temporary name used for the AM sister station of The Pulse of West Yorkshire.

History

The station began life as Pennine Radio which was part of the Yorkshire Radio Network, but when it split its AM and FM frequencies, the medium wave licence became Classic Gold. Following a take over it was then relaunched as Great Yorkshire Radio, and then Great Yorkshire Gold.

However, in 1997 promotional trailers began running across all three stations in the network saying that they would be soon converting to become Magic, despite the fact that this would not be the case in West Yorkshire, where negotiations were underway to take GWR's Classic Gold service. Unhappy with the confusion, bosses in Bradford decided to create an emergency local service, hence the name 1278 and 1530 AM West Yorkshire which ran for a short period until Classic Gold started. The station later became West Yorkshire's Big AM, Pennine's Big AM, West Yorkshire's Classic Gold, Pulse Classic Gold and Pulse 2.

References

Defunct radio stations in the United Kingdom
Radio stations in Yorkshire